The 2019 Meistriliiga (known as A. Le Coq Premium Liiga for sponsorship reasons) was the 29th season of the Meistriliiga, the top Estonian league for association football clubs. The season began on 8 March 2019 and concluded on 9 November 2019. Nõmme Kalju were the defending champions. Flora won their 12th Meistriliiga title.

Teams
Ten teams competed in the league, nine sides from the 2018 season and 2018 Esiliiga champions Maardu Linnameeskond. Vaprus were relegated at the end of the 2018 season after finishing in the bottom of the table. Maardu Linnameeskond made their Meistriliiga debut having previously declined promotion after winning the 2017 Esiliiga. Kuressaare retained their Meistriliiga spot after winning a relegation playoff against Esiliiga runners-up Elva.

Venues

Personnel and kits

Managerial changes

League table

Relegation play-offs
At season's end Kuressaare, the ninth place club, participated in a two-legged play-off with the runners-up (of independent teams) of the 2019 Esiliiga, Vaprus, for the spot in 2020 Meistriliiga.

Kuressaare won 5–3 on aggregate and retained their Meistriliiga spot for the 2020 season.

Results
Each team played every opponent four times, twice at home and twice away. A total of 180 matches were played, with 36 matches by each team.

First half of season

Second half of season

Season statistics

Top scorers

Hat-tricks

4 Player scored four goals5 Player scored five goals

Awards

Monthly awards

Player transfers
 Winter 2018–19 – before the season

See also
 2019 in Estonian football

References

External links
Official website

Meistriliiga seasons
1
Estonia
Estonia